Michaelstow ( (village) and  (parish)) is a civil parish and village in north Cornwall, England, United Kingdom. The hamlets of Fentonadle, Trevenning and Treveighan are in the parish.

The civil parish of Michaelstow is in the deanery of Trigg Minor and Hundred of Lesnewth. It is named after 'St Michael's holy place' and the parish church is dedicated to St Michael and All Angels. There is fine, tall Cornish cross in the churchyard. Its original location is unknown; it formed part of a series of steps up to the churchyard until it was removed in 1883. Three more crosses are at Trevenning. The River Camel runs along its eastern edge and the surrounding parishes are Lanteglos-by-Camelford to the north, St Breward to the east, St Tudy to the south and St Teath to the west.

Helsbury Castle, an Iron Age hill fort, stands on Michaelstow Beacon half-a-mile north of the village.

References

Further reading

 Maclean, John (1872–79) The Parochial and Family History of the Deanery of Trigg Minor. 3 vols. London: Nichols & Son

Villages in Cornwall
Civil parishes in Cornwall